The 2001 AF2 season was the second season of the AF2. The league champions were the Quad City Steamwheelers, who defended their title with a victory over the Richmond Speed in ArenaCup II. This is the first time that both conferences contained two divisions each, like the Arena Football League.

League info

Standings

 Green indicates clinched playoff berth
 Purple indicates division champion
 Grey indicates best regular season record

Playoffs

Awards and honors

Regular season awards

ArenaCup II

ArenaCup II was the 2001 edition of the AF2's championship game, in which the American Conference Champions Richmond Speed were defeated by the National Conference Champions Quad City Steamwheelers in Moline, Illinois by a score of 55 to 51.

References

External links
 2001 af2 stats
 Arena Cup II stats

Af2 seasons